The 1994 German Formula Three Championship was a multi-event motor racing championship for single-seat open wheel formula racing cars that held across Europe. The championship featured drivers competing in two-litre Formula Three racing cars majorly built by Dallara which conform to the technical regulations, or formula, for the championship. It commenced on 9 April at Zolder and ended at Hockenheim on 9 October after ten double-header rounds.

Marko RSM driver Jörg Müller became a champion. He dominated the season, winning eleven of 20 races. Alexander Wurz finished as runner-up with three wins, all achieved at Hockenheim, losing 71 points to Müller. Ralf Schumacher won at Singen, completing the top-three in the drivers' championship. Norberto Fontana and Philipp Peter were the other race winners. Arnd Meier clinched the B-Cup championship title.

Teams and drivers
{|
|

Calendar
With the exception of round at Zolder in Belgium, all rounds took place on German soil.

Results

Notes

Championship standings

A-Class
Points are awarded as follows:

References

External links
 

German Formula Three Championship seasons
Formula Three season